Convergence is an album by David Arkenstone and David Lanz, released in 1996. It is a compilation of tracks from Narada releases such as A Childhood Remembered and The Narada Wilderness Collection.

Track listing
"Madre De La Tierra" (Lanz) – 3:23
"Yosemite" (Arkenstone) – 5:34
"Madrona" (Lanz) – 3:40
"The North Wind" (Arkenstone) – 6:42
"The Dragon's Daughter" (Lanz/Speer) – 4:40
"Long Way From Home" (Arkenstone) – 3:49
"A Thousand Small Gold Bells" (Arkenstone) – 6:08
"Oaks" (Lanz/Rumbel/Tingstad) – 4:40
"The Cello's Song" (Arkenstone/Kostia) – 7:07
"Love on the Beach" (Arkenstone) – 4:52
"Keeper of the Flame" (Lanz) – 3:24

References

1996 albums
David Arkenstone albums
Narada Productions albums